Raja Narayan Deb (Bengali: রাজা নারায়ণ দেব) is an Indian music director, composer working in the Bengali film industry. He is a member of the Shobhabazar Rajbari. He was a member of the Bangla band "Parash Pathar".

Discography

As a music director 

 Khela (2008)
 Shob Charitro Kalponik (2009)
 Clerk (2010)
 Noukadubi (2011)
 Kashmakash (2011)
 Bhooter Bhabishyat (2012)
 Balukabela.com (2012)
 Kidnapper (2013)
 C/O Sir (2013)
 Bangla Naache Bhangra (2013)
 Mukti... (2013)
 Ashchorjyo Prodeep (2013)
 Nirbashito (2014)
 Jodi Love Dile Na Prane (2014)
 Sangabora (2016)
 Khoj (2017 film) (2017)
 Typewriter (TV series) (2018)
 Andarkahini: Self-exile (2019)

As a background music composer 
 Manojder Adbhut Bari (2018), Bengali cinema.
 My Story (2018), Malayalam film.
 Life Express (2010)
 033 (2010)
 Aamar Aami (2014)
 Bawal (2015)
 "Andarkahini: Self-exile" (2019)

As a playback singer 
 Abohomaan (2010)

References

External links 
 

Indian film score composers
Living people
Bengali playback singers
Bollywood playback singers
Indian male playback singers
Indian male film score composers
Year of birth missing (living people)
Musicians from Kolkata